The Postal Accountability and Enhancement Act (PAEA) is a United States federal statute enacted by the 109th United States Congress and signed into law by President George W. Bush on December 20, 2006.

The bill was introduced in the United States House of Representatives by Tom Davis, a Republican from Virginia, and cosponsored by Republican John M. McHugh of New York and Democrats Henry Waxman of California and Danny K. Davis of Illinois. As the chair of the Senate Oversight committee, Senator Susan Collins of Maine shepherded the bill's passage through the Senate. The bill was approved during the lame duck session of the 109th Congress, and approved without objection via voice vote.

PAEA was the first major overhaul of the United States Postal Service (USPS) since 1970. It reorganized the Postal Rate Commission, compelled the USPS to pay in advance for the health and retirement benefits of all of its employees for at least 50 years, and stipulated that the price of postage could not increase faster than the rate of inflation. It also mandated the USPS to deliver six days of the week. According to Tom Davis, the Bush administration threatened to veto the legislation unless they added the provision regarding funding the employee benefits in advance with the objective of using that money to reduce the federal deficit. When he signed the bill on December 20, 2006, Bush issued a signing statement that says that the government can open mail under emergency conditions, though Waxman asserted that the government cannot do this without a search warrant.
 
Between 2007 and 2016, the USPS lost $62.4 billion; the inspector general of the USPS estimated that $54.8 billion of that was due to prefunding retiree benefits. By the end of 2019, the USPS had $160.9 billion in debt, due to growth of the Internet, the Great Recession, and prepaying for employee benefits as stipulated in PAEA. Mail volume decreased from 97 billion to 68 billion items from 2006 to 2012. The employee benefits cost the USPS about $5.5 billion per year; USPS began defaulting on this payment in 2012. The COVID-19 pandemic further reduced income due to decreased demand in 2020.  The latest quarterly financials  of the USPS do not suggest the COVID-19 pandemic further reduced income due to decreased demand in 2020.

Columnist Dan Casey wrote in a July 2014 op-ed in The Roanoke Times that the PAEA is "one of the most insane laws Congress ever enacted". Bill Pascrell, a Democratic House member from New Jersey, said in 2019 that it was rushed through Congress without due consideration, and referred to it as "one of the worst pieces of legislation Congress has passed in a generation". In May 2020, a segment on Last Week Tonight with John Oliver examined the law and its impact on the USPS, demonstrating that it has contributed to its debt. It has been alleged that this legislation contributed to the 2020 United States Postal Service crisis.

The USPS Fairness Act was introduced in 2021 with bipartisan support by Peter DeFazio in the U.S. House and by Steve Daines and Brian Schatz in the U.S. Senate, would undo substantial parts of the PAEA. It eventually passed the Senate as part of the Postal Service Reform Act of 2022.

References

Presidency of George W. Bush
United States federal postal legislation
Acts of the 109th United States Congress